The Sri Lanka national cricket team toured the West Indies in June 1997 to play 2 Test matches and 1 Limited Overs Internationals. This was the first time Sri Lanka had played a Test match in the West Indies. Both series were won by the West Indies. Sri Lanka were captained by Arjuna Ranatunga; the West Indies by Courtney Walsh.

Squads

ODI series

Only ODI

Test series summary

1st Test

2nd Test

References

External links
 Sri Lanka tour of West Indies 1997

1997 in cricket
1997 in Sri Lankan cricket
1997 in West Indian cricket
1997
International cricket competitions from 1994–95 to 1997
West Indian cricket seasons from 1970–71 to 1999–2000